Tacamahac is the name of medicinal resins, now little used, obtained from several plant sources including Calophyllum tacamahaca and Calophyllum inophyllum.

The word has sometimes been regarded, apparently wrongly, as a synonym of balm of Gilead.

External links
U. S. Dispensatory, 1918 (Henriette's Herbal Homepage)

Resins